Phycita diaphana is a species of snout moth. It is found in Portugal, Spain, Greece, Iraq, Egypt, Syria, Madagascar, Mauritius, Réunion, Yemen, Western Sahara and Israel.

Description
The wingspan is 23–26 mm.

Biology
Phycita diaphana is a common, invasive pest of Ricinus communis (Euphorbiaceae) throughout the Mediterranean region. In addition to R. communis, Ph. diaphana
larvae are also found feeding on Populus euphranica Oliv. (Salicaceae) and Chrozophora tintoria (L.) (= verbascifolia (Willd.)) (Euphorbiaceae). Yelicones iranus (Fischer, 1963) (Hymenoptera: Braconidae: Rogadinae) has been reported as a parasitoid of caterpillars of Phycita diaphana in Israel.

References

Moths described in 1870
Phycitini
Moths of Europe